NZMS may stand for:
Hood Aerodrome, in Masterton, New Zealand, an aerodrome with ICAO code NZMS
New Zealand Mathematical Society
New Zealand Meteorological Service, the predecessor to MetService
New Zealand Mapping Service, a predecessor to Land Information New Zealand, and the maps produced by them
Identity numbers for manuscripts in the Auckland Libraries